Návojná is a municipality and village in Zlín District in the Zlín Region of the Czech Republic. It has about 700 inhabitants.

History
The first written mention of Návojná is from 1503.

Sights
Návojský dub is a 300 years old protected oak.

The landmark of the village is the Chapel of the Holy Trinity.

References

External links

Villages in Zlín District